The Graffiti Awards are honors recognizing achievement in Uruguayan music. They were created in 2003.

History
When they were first established in 2003, the Graffiti Awards only rewarded Uruguayan rock. In subsequent years they became more representative, and went on to reward all genres of the music of Uruguay.

Since 2014, the ceremony has been held at the National Auditorium of Sodre.

Categories
Of the 35 categories awarded, three are chosen by popular vote through the Internet: Artist of the Year, Album of the Year, and Theme of the Year. The Graffiti Career Award has been granted to musicians such as Jaime Roos, Hugo and Osvaldo Fattoruso, Gabriel Peluffo and Gustavo Parodi, Rubén Rada, Jorge Galemire, José Carbajal, Jorge Nasser, and Los Olimareños.

References

External links
 

2003 establishments in Uruguay
Arts awards in Uruguay
Awards established in 2003
South American music awards
Uruguayan music